Vanuatu competed at the 1996 Summer Olympics in Atlanta, United States.

Athletics

Men

Track events

Women

Track events

References
Official Olympic Reports

Nations at the 1996 Summer Olympics
1996
1996 in Vanuatuan sport